Cannonball (Samuel Zachary Guthrie) is a superhero appearing in American comic books published by Marvel Comics, commonly in association with the X-Men. Created by writer Chris Claremont and artist Bob McLeod, Cannonball first appeared in The New Mutants (Sept. 1982).

Cannonball is a mutant who uses the ability to fly at jet speeds while encased in an impenetrable force field. Cannonball was a founding member of the X-Men's junior team, the New Mutants, and served as X-Force's second-in-command and field leader. He eventually joined the X-Men, becoming the first member of a secondary team to "graduate". The eldest of a large Kentucky coal mining family, several of his siblings, such as Husk, Aero, Icarus and Jeb, are also mutants and have joined X-Men-related teams.

Charlie Heaton portrayed Sam Guthrie in the 2020 film The New Mutants (2020).

Publication history

Created by writer Chris Claremont and artist Bob McLeod, Cannonball first appeared in The New Mutants graphic novel (September 1982) as a member of the titular super-group. McLeod later commented, "I always liked Cannonball the best [of the New Mutants]. I tried to give all the mutants distinct body types and characteristics, and with his big ears and lanky frame, he was just the most fun to draw."

After a guest appearance in The Uncanny X-Men # 167, the character appeared regularly in the title The New Mutants from its first issue to its hundredth issue (1983-1991), and continued to appear in its replacement title X-Force (1991). In X-Force # 44 (1995), Cannonball leaves X-Force to join the X-Men, appearing regularly in X-Men #48-89 and The Uncanny X-Men #323-355 (1995-1998). He rejoins his friends in X-Force while on an extended road trip in X-Force # 86 (1998), and stays with the team through issue # 117 (2001), after which the title changes drastically, taken over by the team later to be known as X-Statix.

Cannonball next appears as a member of the X-Corporation in New X-Men #128, 130, 131 and 140 (2002-2003), and then rejoins the X-Men in a splinter team led by Storm in X-Treme X-Men #24-46 (2003-2004). After the cancellation of X-Treme X-Men, Cannonball appears regularly with the X-Men in the mid to late 2000s, including The Uncanny X-Men #444-447 (2004) and #466-474 (2006), X-Men #188-204 (2006-2007), Young X-Men #1-6 (2008) and Secret Invasion: X-Men #1-4 (2009). He and Sunspot also appear in Astonishing Tales #1-6 (2009).

In 2009, New Mutants was relaunched in its third volume, penned by Zeb Wells, though in this incarnation they were a strike team of X-Men with a defined roster, including Mirage, Karma, Sunspot, Magma, Magik, Cypher and Warlock. Cannonball appears as a regular from issue #1 through #25 (2009-2011). The New Mutants were a major fixture in the Second Coming event, in which Cannonball and his team appear in The Uncanny X-Men #523–524, X-Force #36 and X-Men: Legacy #234-235 (2010).

Cannonball would be featured during Second Coming in the X-Men: Hellbound miniseries #1-3 (2010), leading the team of Pixie, Gambit, Anole, Dazzler, Trance and Northstar to Limbo to rescue Magik.

In the Age of X event, Cannonball suffered mental trauma as the field leader of a bastion under constant siege, causing him to leave the New Mutants in X-Regenesis #1 (2011) and New Mutants #25 vol. 3 (2011). He would leave the X-Men's base on Utopia to join Wolverine's faction at the Jean Grey School for Higher Learning in New York, joining Rogue's team in X-Men: Legacy #260.1-#267 (2012).

Cannonball and Sunspot were asked by Captain America to join the Avengers, bridging the gap between humans and mutants in the aftermath of the Avengers vs. X-Men event. He appears in Avengers vol. 5 #1-23 (2013) and #38-44 (2015), Avengers World #1-18 (2014-2015), U.S. Avengers #1-12 (2017), and Avengers #675-690 (2018) during the No Surrender event.

He later rejoined the X-Men in The Uncanny X-Men vol. 5 #1 (2018) and remains in regular publication in that title.

Fictional character biography

Origin
Sam Guthrie was born in Cumberland, Kentucky. As a young boy, he attempted to help out his family by working in the coal mine in which his father had worked before he died. One day, Sam finds himself trapped in a collapsing mine shaft. While trying to rescue his fellow worker, Mr. Lewis, from a collapsing mine shaft, his mutant ability unconsciously manifests and saves the two. Sam is soon hired by Donald Pierce of the Hellfire Club to help attack the New Mutants. When Pierce orders Sam to kill the defeated New Mutants, Sam rebels against him, and Charles Xavier asks Sam to join the New Mutants, which he does under the alias "Cannonball".

New Mutants

As part of the New Mutants, Cannonball becomes close friends with his teammate Sunspot. He also develops a brotherly affection for Rahne, unaware for some time that she had romantic feelings for him.

Cannonball and Danielle Moonstar act as the team's co-leaders. He also supervises other teammates, including Magik, Karma, Cypher, Magma, and Warlock. Cannonball helps lead the team through many adventures across time and space, from ancient Scotland to other galaxies. During one of his adventures, he meets the mutant rock musician Lila Cheney, with whom he begins a romantic relationship.

The Beyonder encounters the New Mutants and kills them. He resurrects them soon after, but this trauma leaves the team deeply shaken, and they go with the villainous Emma Frost to her Massachusetts Academy and join the Hellions. They soon come to their senses, however.

Wolfsbane, Warlock, Rictor, and Tabitha are kidnapped from the grounds of the X-Mansion by Genoshan forces under the control of Cameron Hodge. Warlock is murdered by Hodge in an attempt to get his powers. Sam joins the X-Men on a rescue mission and Genosha's government is toppled. Rahne stays behind to help the fellow victims of Genosha's regime.

X-Force
Cannonball and the other New Mutants leave the X-Men's supervision and join forces with Cable to become the hard-edged X-Force, and is appointed the team's second-in-command and field leader. Cannonball is impaled and killed during a clash with the Brotherhood of Mutants, but heals only a few minutes later. Cable reveals himself to be from a dystopian future ruled by Apocalypse and explains that he believes Cannonball to be an External, a particularly rare type of mutant who is virtually immortal. Many other Externals, such as Saul and Gideon, also come to believe Sam is one of them. It is around this time that Sam's sister, Paige, is revealed to have mutant powers.

Sam's time in X-Force is not easy, as he is considered 'out of line' by the X-Men and X-Force are considered outright criminals by S.H.I.E.L.D. This devolves into a fight between a S.H.I.E.L.D. team led by Nick Fury. Later, any rivalries are put aside as Sam is instrumental in helping the other X-Men, particularly Forge and Wolfsbane, defeat the Phalanx.

X-Men

Sam later joins the X-Men. Initially, he is excited, but begins to doubt his abilities. He faces these when he battles the Shi'ar Gladiator to a standstill.

Cannonball finds his relationship with Tabitha strained, and she turns to Sam's best friend, Sunspot, for "support". Sam leaves the X-Men to help his ailing mother. During his time with the X-Men, he also infiltrates the presidential campaign of anti-mutant candidate Graydon Creed, using the alias "Samson Guthry". Despite the rather transparent alias, Sam is able to remain undetected until Creed is assassinated on the eve of the election.

Cannonball rejoins X-Force, now operating in San Francisco, and becomes team leader after Siryn is injured. Cable has left, but the team find a new mentor in Pete Wisdom, who introduces the team to the world of espionage. Sam and Tabitha get back together. After Wisdom's alleged death, Sam leads the team again and attempts to continue Wisdom's crusade. Eventually, Sam and the other members of X-Force have to fake their deaths.

Back to basics
Storm asks Cannonball to join her X-Treme X-Men, a group of X-Men operating outside of Professor X's leadership. The team later rejoins the central X-Men. Sam is injured on a mission and once again decided to break for some peace. He uses the time to work on his own farm, which he had bought with his X-Corporation paychecks. While on the farm, Sam found himself teaming up again with Cable and reformed X-Force against the threat of the Skornn.

Sam has once more joined the active roster of the X-Men, whose team is co-led by Nightcrawler and Bishop. For a while, he watches over the younger, more carefree students at the X-Mansion. He also functions as a member of the X-Treme Sanctions Executive (XSE). He has already participated in helping the 198 and fighting the Shi'ar Death Commandos. He soon suffers the death of his brother Jay, who is killed by William Stryker. In the first part of The First Foursaken story arc, Cannonball went with the X-Men to Central Park, where they fight the Foursaken, who then capture the X-Men and sent them elsewhere. After escaping, Cannonball accompanies the X-Men to Africa to help Storm assist mutant refugees.

Rogue's team
Cannonball serves on Rogue's team of X-Men. After the team fights the Hecatomb and Rogue suffers a severe mental injury, the team decide to rest in Rogue's childhood home, but are attacked by the Marauders, who are on a mission to retrieve Destiny's Diaries. Emma Frost (who was trying to help Rogue) is disabled by a neurotoxin, but uploads everything she got from the edges of the Marauders' psi-shielding into Sam's mind and takes limited possession over his body. Aboard the Blackbird, the two are engaged in midair by Sunfire, who cripples the jet. Cannonball manages to escape and battle Shiro, who reveals that he killed Cable. Cannonball shakes it off, explaining that it "wouldn't matter who told me that, ah'd still be sayin' 'show me the body.'"

Cannonball and Iceman attempt to recover the Destiny Diaries, which are hidden in a dilapidated brewery. The Marauders attack them, and Sam is seriously injured. Dr. Henry McCoy attends to his injuries and evaluates his condition. He notes that Sam's brain scan indicates sluggish and non-continuous activity, but the young mutant quickly recovers and is capable of taking part in the final fight against the Marauders.

Divided We Stand
After Cyclops disbands the X-Men, Cannonball goes home. His sister Paige picks him up at the airport, extremely happy to have him back, but Sam is moody and withdrawn, and after she confronts him about his mood he angrily blasts off into the sky saying he should have never come home.

Manifest Destiny
Sam is soon called by Cyclops, informing him that the X-Men are reforming in San Francisco, and he agrees to join the new team. He arrives in San Francisco as Magneto is attacking the city with a group of antique Sentinels. Sam manages to plow into Magneto, disarming his artificial magnetism suit, and giving the X-Men the upper hand in the battle. However, Magneto still manages to escape. He is later seen at a bar with Karma and Dani Moonstar, where he reveals himself to be disillusioned by the idea of changing the world and instead is content with making sure no one else dies the way his brother Jay did. He is called upon to help deal with Empath.

Reforming the New Mutants
After receiving an anonymous tip in Colorado about a young mutant endangering a small town, Dani and Shan are sent to investigate and calm the locals. During their mission, Magik reappears back at the X-Men's base in San Francisco after teleporting off into the future after the events of "X-Infernus". Upon her return, she informs Sam and Roberto that Shan and Dani are in trouble and it will result in their deaths. Cannonball, Sunspot, Magma and Magik go to find them. They eventually find an unconscious Shan and are tricked into freeing Legion.

The personalities in Legion's mind want to kill Dani because she can help Legion get them under control. Legion locates Dani in a jail cell and is about to kill her when Sam stops him. Dani tells Sam to let her out but Sam refuses, saying she'll be safer in the cell since she does not have her powers anymore. Sam and Roberto go off to fight Legion leaving Dani behind. Unbeknownst to them, one of Legion's personalities has the ability to project himself and is stalling them while he prepares to kill Dani only to be stopped by Magik and Magma. They free Dani as Legion retreats, Sam apologizes but gets punched in the face by an angry Dani. When asked where she's going Dani replies "to make myself useful"; she returns brandishing numerous firearms and tells the others that they're going after Legion. However Sam tells Dani to go, she is not a mutant anymore and to stop pretending she is because one of the most powerful mutants on earth wants her dead. Dani, upset gets into a van and drives away only to turn back minutes later after Sam and the rest of the New Mutants are badly beaten. After Legion is caught, Sam tries to apologize but Dani limps away, ignoring him. Sam confesses to Cyclops he feels as if he has messed up but Cyclops congratulates him on keeping everyone alive and that's all that matters.

In the aftermath of Utopia, Scott reveals to Dani that Sam did not pick her for his team, making her very upset and angry. The two fight and come to an understanding and Sam allows Dani on the team. Later, over a conversation about Sam's past romantic affiliations (particularly Lila Cheney) Sam and Danielle share a kiss (for comparative purposes) that is interrupted by the team.

Regenesis
Wolverine hires him to work at his new school. Cannonball teaches a course in flying; those who have no natural flying abilities use jetpacks. Samuel takes time to check in with his sister Husk, who works for the school full-time, and is worried about her mental state.

As part of the Marvel NOW! event, Cannonball becomes a member of the Avengers along with Sunspot. He is seen eight months in the future living on an alien planet in the Shi'ar empire with Izzy Kane and their child.

U.S.Avengers
Cannonball becomes a member of the U.S. Avengers. Their first mission takes place at the Secret Empire's floating volcanic island base. They are later approached by a future version of Danielle Cage as Captain America, who tells them that her nemesis, the Golden Skull, has come to their timeline to steal all the wealth in the world. The team defeats and captures the Golden Skull, and Danielle takes him back to her timeline.

During the "Opening Salvo" part of the Secret Empire storyline, Cannonball decides to quit the team so he could live with his wife and son. During the event, he returns to Earth only to discover the Alpha Flight Space Program, the Guardians of the Galaxy, and the Ultimates' battle against the Chitauri. He joins the heroes in battle, but is presumed dead when a Chitauri dragon eats Quasar and explodes. An alien finds him, and he is later sold at an auction on an alien planet to a mysterious human named Howard Mason, who brings him to an Earth-like small town on an alien planet. Cannonball's wife meets with Sunspot and tells him that Cannonball is alive on another planet.

While the team travels through space, Cannonball is introduced to the townspeople by Ritchie Redwood, ruler of the planet, and, upon discovering the people's troublesome behavior, tries to escape only to be defeated and captured. Awakening in a dungeon, Cannonball meets other prisoners, including a teen named Bugface. Cannonball stages a prison break and they head out to overthrow Ritchie. During the fight, Smasher and the U.S.Avengers arrive to help. After Ritchie and his army are sent to prison, the heroes head back home.

Powers and abilities
Cannonball is a mutant who possesses the ability to bodily generate thermo-chemical energy and release it from his skin. This energy is used as thrust to cause his body to be propelled through the air like a rocket, at great heights and speeds with considerable maneuverability. He can control his speed and direction through sheer act of will. At first, he could only release this energy from his feet and legs, but now he can fire it from almost any part of his body, to a wide variety of effects. This energy also manifests itself as an impenetrable and virtually indestructible "blast field" that protects him from bodily harm. He can use this blast-field for the following effects: to function as a personal shield or extending it to encompass others, to shape the field around another person to imprison them, or to absorb outside kinetic impact into his own energy supply, enabling him to increase the bludgeoning power of his blows or to create explosive shock waves upon impact.

His power levels have varied over the years - but at his peak, he has been able to absorb (and redirect) the force of one of Gladiator's punches.

He may also be a member of the immortal mutant group the Externals, due to his apparent ability to return to life after death.

Reception
 In 2014, Entertainment Weekly ranked Cannonball 42nd in their "Let's rank every X-Man ever" list.
 In 2018, CBR.com ranked Cannonball 11th in their "20 Most Powerful Mutants From The '80s" list.
 In 2018, CBR.com ranked Cannonball 16th in their "X-Force: 20 Powerful Members" list.

Other versions

Age of Apocalypse
In the Age of Apocalypse storyline, the Guthrie family was eliminated during the Cullings, with only Sam, Paige, Elisabeth, and Joshua being spared due to their mutant status. They were approached by Mister Sinister, who offered them the chance to become part of his Elite Mutant Force. Sam took on the alias Cannonball and became a member of the EMF alongside his sister, Elisabeth, a.k.a. Amazon. He and his sister were particularly violent towards the prisoners of Sinister's breeding pens, as was their superior Havok, to whom Cannonball was loyal. When the Elite Mutant Force was taken over by Havok due to Prelate Cyclops' betrayal, Cannonball fought the Bedlam brothers, who sided with the older Summers brother. Cannonball and Amazon survived and eventually reunited with Husk, whom they rescue from the Seattle Core, and Icarus, and together they set out to fulfill Husk's "revenge" against the X-Men for Colossus' abandonment of her in the Core. He, along with his siblings, was killed in fighting the X-Men, personally being crushed in a metallic orb along with his brother by Magneto.

Age of X
In the Age of X reality, Cannonball and Husk are shown breaking mutants out of prison and slaying the mutant hunters. They are then approached by Magneto and his team of X-Men to join up with them.

Days of Future Past
During a fight with Warlock's father Magus, Magik accidentally ends up teleporting her whole team, split up, into two alternative future timelines. In one of them, where the Sentinels have destroyed most of Earth's mutants, that timeline's version of Cannonball, Mirage and Lila Cheney have established a guerrilla operation to take mutants to temporary safety in Cheney's Dyson sphere.

Year 2043
In the ongoing Cable series, set in 2043, an older Cannonball arrives when Cable is badly hurt and unable to time travel. Solicitations of the comics refer to Cannonball as Cable's "old war buddy." Cannonball implies that he, Cable, Bishop, and the baby are the last living mutants, and that he found him with Cerebra, which was rigged for non-psychics to use after the last psychic died. Cannonball allows Cable to escape with the child, opting to stay and distract Bishop. Bishop pleads with Sam not to fight, but Cannonball persists, harboring a decades-long grudge against the traitorous former X-Man, and after a long fight, Bishop is forced to kill him using a claw-like tentacle from his new bionic arm (stolen from Forge) to rip out Guthrie's heart. As Cannonball dies, he asks Bishop why, to which Bishop responds, with visions of his future, mutants with M's on their faces and herded into concentration camps, "To save you".

House of M
Cannonball had no House of M counterpart because he was traveling through realities with Siryn and Deadpool when the change wave occurred. However, Wolverine did beat up a young blond man for his motorbike, which was called the 'Cannonball X'.

Last Avengers Story
In an alternate future, Hank Pym recruits Cannonball to be part of a new Avengers, to fight Ultron and Kang. In the climactic battle, Kang murders Guthrie with a shot to the head.

Marvel Zombies
In Ultimate Fantastic Four #23, Sam, wearing his yellow and black New Mutants uniform, is one of the dozens of zombies endangering a small trio of humans, Magneto and 'Ultimate' Reed Richards. They had tracked down the humans through the ruins of Manhattan; most of the rest of the Earth had been consumed already.

Mutant X
In the Mutant X universe, Sam was drawn as a very overweight mutant while his sister had an ugly appearance. The two would constantly insult one another. Due to his increased weight, Sam could not stay in Cannonball mode for long. The two worked with Wolfsbane, Sunspot, and Jubilee as the 'Marauders', a murderous band of thieves based in the sewers.

Ultimate Marvel
In the Ultimate universe, Cannonball is a member of Emma Frost's Academy of Tomorrow, a somewhat more pacifistic alternative to the X-Men. He is the newest member.

When fellow student Lorna Dane is framed for murder and thus imprisoned in the Triskelion her boyfriend, Alex Summers, recruits a strike team. Sam and Alex are joined by Sunspot, Douglas Ramsey, and Northstar. During the trip to New York, the team becomes lost and is ambushed by the X-Men. Cannonball initially sweeps Wolverine off his feet, but is soon defeated. Magneto has him killed in the crossover called 'Ultimatum' along with the rest of the Academy of Tomorrow except for Havok.

What If?
In What If the X-Men stayed in Asgard? Sam, among several members of the X-Men and the New Mutants, decides to stay in Asgard and marries Kindra, daughter of the dwarf king Eitri. When Eitri dies in battle later on, Sam becomes the new King of the Dwarves.

In other media

Television

 Cannonball appears in the X-Men: The Animated Series episode "Hidden Agenda", voiced by Adrian Egan.
 Cannonball appears in X-Men: Evolution, voiced by Bill Switzer. This version is a member of the X-Men's junior team, the New Mutants.

Film
Samuel "Sam" Guthrie / Cannonball appears in The New Mutants, portrayed by Charlie Heaton. This version accidentally killed his father, along with a group of miners.

Video games
 Cannonball appears in the PSP version of X-Men Legends II: Rise of Apocalypse. This version's powers revolve around a "blast shield".
 Cannonball appears as an unlockable character in Marvel: Avengers Alliance.

Miscellaneous
Cannonball appears in the novelization of X-Men: The Last Stand as a student of the Xavier Institute.

References

External links
UncannyXmen.net Spotlight on Cannonball II
Cannonball (Sam Guthrie) at the Marvel Universe Character Bio Wiki
Propulsion - TFL Cannonball Fanlisting

Avengers (comics) characters
Characters created by Bob McLeod
Characters created by Chris Claremont
Comics characters introduced in 1982
Fictional characters from Kentucky
Fictional farmers
Fictional mercenaries in comics
Fictional mining engineers
Marvel Comics American superheroes
Marvel Comics characters who can move at superhuman speeds
Marvel Comics male superheroes
Marvel Comics mutants
New Mutants
X-Men members